Davis Ice Rise is an ice rise,  long, near the terminus of Smith Glacier,  southeast of Mayo Peak, Bear Peninsula, on the Walgreen Coast, Marie Byrd Land. It was mapped by the United States Geological Survey from U.S. Navy aerial photographs taken 1966 and from Landsat imagery taken 1972–73. It was named by the Advisory Committee on Antarctic Names after Commander Arthur R. Davis, U.S. Navy, Supply Officer, Operation Deep Freeze, 1975–76 and 1976–77.

References 

Ice rises of Antarctica
Bodies of ice of Marie Byrd Land